Edwin Daniel Uceta (born January 9, 1998) is a Dominican professional baseball pitcher for the Detroit Tigers of Major League Baseball (MLB). He has played in MLB for the Los Angeles Dodgers and Arizona Diamondbacks.

Career

Los Angeles Dodgers
Uceta signed with the Dodgers organization on July 2, 2016, for $10,000, when he was 16 years old by Dodger Scout Matthew Doppelt and spent that season with the Dominican Summer League Dodgers, where he was 2–1 with a 1.72 ERA in  innings over 11 games (3 starts) The following season, he was assigned to the Ogden Raptors of the rookie-class Pioneer League, where he was the starting pitcher in the league championship game that the Raptors won. In 2018, he was promoted to the Class-A Great Lakes Loons of the Midwest League and recognized as one of the Dodgers top-30 prospects by MLB Pipeline. He was 5–6 with a 3.2 ERA in 20 starts for the Loons. He split the 2019 season between the Rancho Cucamonga Quakes of the California League and the Tulsa Drillers of the Texas League, pitching to a combined 11–2 record and 2.77 ERA in 26 games (24 of them starts). He was a mid-season all-star for the Quakes and started the Texas League Championship Game and pitched four scoreless innings though the Drillers lost the game late.

The Dodgers added Uceta to their 40-man roster after the 2020 season. On April 29, 2021, Uceta was promoted to the major leagues for the first time. He made his debut the next day as the starting pitcher against the Milwaukee Brewers. In the game, he took the loss as he allowed four hits and two runs in two innings while recording his first MLB strikeout of Travis Shaw. He pitched in 14 games for the Dodgers major league squad, with a record of 0–3 and a 6.64 ERA over  innings. In the minor leagues, he appeared in 10 games (with three starts) for the Triple-A Oklahoma City Dodgers, with a 4.71 ERA and a 2–3 record. He was designated for assignment by the Dodgers on October 21, 2021.

Arizona Diamondbacks
On October 27, 2021, Uceta was claimed off of waivers by the Arizona Diamondbacks. He made 10 appearances for the Diamondbacks in 2022, logging a 5.82 ERA with 13 strikeouts in 17.0 innings pitched and compiled a 6-1 record and 4.86 ERA in 28 appearances in his time with the Triple-A Reno Aces.

On January 5, 2023, Uceta was designated for assignment by Arizona to make space on the 40-man roster for the newly signed Evan Longoria.

Detroit Tigers
On January 11, 2023, Uceta was claimed off waivers by the Detroit Tigers.

References

External links

Living people
1998 births
Dominican Republic expatriate baseball players in the United States
Major League Baseball players from the Dominican Republic
Major League Baseball pitchers
Los Angeles Dodgers players
Arizona Diamondbacks players
Dominican Summer League Dodgers players
Ogden Raptors players
Rancho Cucamonga Quakes players
Great Lakes Loons players
Tulsa Drillers players
Estrellas Orientales players
Oklahoma City Dodgers players
Arizona Complex League Dodgers players